A Turma do Balão Mágico is the third studio album by Brazilian band  Turma do Balão Mágico, released on September 9, 1984, by CBS Records. According to Manchete magazine the album sold 1.5 million copies by 1985. According to O Globo a further 2.5 million copies were sold. It was the first album to feature the new member Jair Oliveira.

Track List

Side A
 "É Tão Lindo" (with Roberto Carlos)
 "Quadrinhas e Um Refrão"
 "Se Enamora"
 "Mãe, Me Dá Um Dinheirinho" (with Pepeu Gomes and Baby Consuelo)
 "Zip e Zap"
 "Bombom"

Side B
 "Amigos do Peito" (with Fábio Júnior)
 "Meu Mocinho, Meu Cowboy"
 "Dia dos Pais"
 "Tia Josefina"
 "Palha e Aço"
 "Dia de Festa" (with Fofão)

Bibliography
Barcinski, André (2014). Pavões Misteriosos — 1974-1983: A explosão da música pop no Brasil. São Paulo: Editora Três Estrelas. 

References 

1984 albums
Portuguese-language albums
Sony Music Brazil albums
CBS Records albums